Abu'l-Futuh al-Hasan ibn Ja'far was the Sharif of Mecca for the Fatimid Caliphate from 994/5 until 1010. He was also briefly proclaimed as an anti-caliph in a rebellion against the Fatimid Caliphate in Palestine in 1010.

Abu al-Futuh succeeded his brother Isa as Emir of Mecca in 384 AH (994/5 CE). He was a member of the Ja'farid dynasty, a Hasanid family that had come to rule Mecca . The family may have had Zaydi leanings, and recognized the suzerainty of the Fatimid Caliphate.

He raised a considerable sum of money and joined the rebels in their capital of Ramla, where he was initially warmly received and acclaimed as "Commander of the Faithful". Soon, however, the money he had brought with him ran out and the Jarrahids ceased to respect him, while they were willing to receive gifts and money from the Fatimid Caliph, al-Hakim bi-Amr Allah. Disheartened, Hasan returned to Mecca and Fatimid allegiance, while the Jarrahid rebellion was crushed by the Fatimid troops in late summer 1010. The motives for his revolt are not entirely clear. On one part they were practical: the Hejaz had suffered due to the cessation of grain shipments, as well as monetary subsidies, from Egypt for the few years preceding the revolt, and the sources explicitly mention that this had caused grievances on the part of al-Hasan. However, the unprecedented decision to actually proclaim a counter-caliphate clearly had ideological motivation as well, being possibly prodded by al-Hakim's demand in 1005 to ritually curse the first two Rashidun caliphs across the Fatimid domains.

Abu al-Futuh died in 430 AH (1038/9), as mentioned by Ibn al-Athir. He was succeeded as Emir by his only son Shukr After his removal in the year 400 AH (1010) AD.

References

Sources
 
 
 
 

10th-century births
1030s deaths
10th-century Arabs
11th-century Arabs
11th-century caliphs
11th-century people from the Fatimid Caliphate
11th-century rulers in Asia
Hasanids
Rebellions against the Fatimid Caliphate
Sharifs of Mecca
Vassal rulers of the Fatimid Caliphate